Kortedala is a district, mainly residential (apartments), in the north-eastern part of Gothenburg in western Sweden. The area has a population of around 10,000 and is one of the typical 1950s suburbs of Gothenburg. The area has many trees and parks. Kortedala also has Gothenburg's largest ice-skating rink, Isdala, and a large sports centre, Alelyckan. There are four local squares, three smaller ones and the larger Kortedala Torg. Kortedala is on tram lines 6, 7 and 11, with line 6 terminating at Aprilgatan.

In 2007, the Swedish musician Jens Lekman released an album titled Night Falls Over Kortedala. He also wrote a song called Tram #7 to Heaven about the tram to Bergsjön (where the streets are named after things to do with outer space), which passes through Kortedala.

Places of interest 
Kortedala Torg - the main square.
Isdala - the ice rink.
Citytorget - another square, where many restaurants and fast food establishments are located. For example, the only Italian pizzeria in eastern Gothenburg is situated here.
Almenacksplan - The local football pitch, where the local club Kortedala IF plays its league games.

Boroughs of Gothenburg